The following is a list of land border crossings of Turkey (i.e. only for motor vehicles, not railways) as of 2013.

See also
Railway border crossings of Turkey
Ministry of Industry and Trade, 2012 Annual Report

References

Border crossings